Thirudan is a 1969 Indian Tamil-language action film, directed by A. C. Tirulokchandar. The film stars Sivaji Ganesan, K. R. Vijaya, K. Balaji and Vijayalalitha. It is a remake of the Telugu film Adrushtavanthulu (1969), and was released on 10 October 1969. The film became a commercial success, running for over 100 days in theatres.

Plot

Cast 
Sivaji Ganesan as Raju
K. R. Vijaya as Radha
Vijaya Lalitha as Chithra
K. Balaji as Jagannath
Major Sundarrajan as Inspector Ragunath
S. V. Ramadas as Vasudevan
Nagesh as Ranga
Pushpamala
M. S. Sundari Bai as Dhanalakshmi
C. K. Saraswathi as Paravatham
Ganthimathi (Guest Role)
Typist Gopu (Guest Role)
Baby Rani as Lakshmi
Baby Sumathi (Guest Role)
Harikrishnan as the Jailer
Sasikumar as a dancer
C.I.D Sakunthala as a dancer

Production 
Thirudan, a remake of the Telugu film Adrushtavanthulu (1969), was directed by A. C. Tirulokchandar and produced by K. Balaji's Sujatha Cine Arts. Ganesan's home, Annai Illam, also features in the film.

Soundtrack 
The music was composed by M. S. Viswanathan, with lyrics by Kannadasan.

Release and reception 
Thirudan was released in select theatres on 10 October 1969, and in others on 17 October. The Indian Express called it an adaptation of Once a Thief "that the original has been mutilated beyond recognition". The reviewer praised Ganesan and Vijaya's performance and called K. Balaji's villainy "naive" and concluded, "If you care for entertainment with a lot of thrill here is the picture".

References

External links 
 

1960s action films
1960s Tamil-language films
1969 films
Films directed by A. C. Tirulokchandar
Films scored by M. S. Viswanathan
Indian action films
Indian black-and-white films
Tamil remakes of Telugu films